Santa Maria Maddalena is a church in Castiglione d'Orcia, Tuscany, central Italy.

The church, in Romanesque style, has  a single nave, ending in a semicircular apse, and a 12th-century bell tower. The facade dates to the 13th century.

References 
Page at  Castiglione d'Orcia town website

External links 

Maria Maddalena Castiglione d'Orcia
Maria Maddalena Castiglione d'Orcia
Maria Maddalena Castiglione d'Orcia
Castiglione d'Orcia